Operation Yonatan can refer to:
Operation Entebbe, also known as Operation Yonatan, a military operation
Mivtsa Yonatan, an Israeli film from 1977 based on Operation Entebbe